Henry I ( – 1 December 1135), also known as Henry Beauclerc, was King of England from 1100 to his death in 1135. He was the fourth son of William the Conqueror and was educated in Latin and the liberal arts. On William's death in 1087, Henry's elder brothers Robert Curthose and William Rufus inherited Normandy and England, respectively, but Henry was left landless. He purchased the County of Cotentin in western Normandy from Robert, but his brothers deposed him in 1091. He gradually rebuilt his power base in the Cotentin and allied himself with William Rufus against Robert.

Present at the place where his brother William died in a hunting accident in 1100, Henry seized the English throne, promising at his coronation to correct many of William's less popular policies. He married Matilda of Scotland and they had two surviving children, Empress Matilda and William Adelin; he also had many illegitimate children by his many mistresses. Robert, who invaded from Normandy in 1101, disputed Henry's control of England; this military campaign ended in a negotiated settlement that confirmed Henry as king. The peace was short-lived, and Henry invaded the Duchy of Normandy in 1105 and 1106, finally defeating Robert at the Battle of Tinchebray. Henry kept Robert imprisoned for the rest of his life. Henry's control of Normandy was challenged by Louis VI of France, Baldwin VII of Flanders and Fulk V of Anjou, who promoted the rival claims of Robert's son, William Clito, and supported a major rebellion in the Duchy between 1116 and 1119. Following Henry's victory at the Battle of Brémule, a favourable peace settlement was agreed with Louis in 1120.

Considered by contemporaries to be a harsh but effective ruler, Henry skillfully manipulated the barons in England and Normandy. In England, he drew on the existing Anglo-Saxon system of justice, local government and taxation, but also strengthened it with more institutions, including the royal exchequer and itinerant justices. Normandy was also governed through a growing system of justices and an exchequer. Many of the officials who ran Henry's system were "new men" of obscure backgrounds, rather than from families of high status, who rose through the ranks as administrators. Henry encouraged ecclesiastical reform, but became embroiled in a serious dispute in 1101 with Archbishop Anselm of Canterbury, which was resolved through a compromise solution in 1105. He supported the Cluniac order and played a major role in the selection of the senior clergy in England and Normandy.

Henry's son William drowned in the White Ship disaster of 1120, throwing the royal succession into doubt. Henry took a second wife, Adeliza of Louvain, in the hope of having another son, but their marriage was childless. In response to this, he declared his daughter Matilda his heir and married her to Geoffrey of Anjou. The relationship between Henry and the couple became strained, and fighting broke out along the border with Anjou. Henry died on 1 December 1135 after a week of illness. Despite his plans for Matilda, the King was succeeded by his nephew Stephen of Blois, resulting in a period of civil war known as the Anarchy.

Early life, 1068–1099

Childhood and appearance, 1068–86
Henry was probably born in England in 1068, in either the summer or the last weeks of the year, possibly in the town of Selby in Yorkshire. His father was William the Conqueror, the Duke of Normandy who had invaded England in 1066 to become the king of England, establishing lands stretching into Wales. The invasion had created an Anglo-Norman ruling class, many with estates on both sides of the English Channel. These Anglo-Norman barons typically had close links to the Kingdom of France, which was then a loose collection of counties and smaller polities, under only the nominal control of the king. Henry's mother, Matilda of Flanders, was the granddaughter of Robert II of France, and she probably named Henry after her uncle, King Henry I of France.

Henry was the youngest of William and Matilda's four sons. Physically he resembled his older brothers Robert Curthose, Richard and William Rufus, being, as historian David Carpenter describes, "short, stocky and barrel-chested," with black hair. As a result of their age differences and Richard's early death, Henry would have probably seen relatively little of his older brothers. He probably knew his sister Adela well, as the two were close in age. There is little documentary evidence for his early years; historians Warren Hollister and Kathleen Thompson suggest he was brought up predominantly in England, while Judith Green argues he was initially brought up in the Duchy. He was probably educated by the Church, possibly by Bishop Osmund, the King's chancellor, at Salisbury Cathedral; it is uncertain if this indicated an intent by his parents for Henry to become a member of the clergy. It is also uncertain how far Henry's education extended, but he was probably able to read Latin and had some background in the liberal arts. He was given military training by an instructor called Robert Achard, and Henry was knighted by his father on 24 May 1086.

Inheritance, 1087–88

In 1087, William was fatally injured during a campaign in the Vexin. Henry joined his dying father near Rouen in September, where the King partitioned his possessions among his sons. The rules of succession in western Europe at the time were uncertain; in some parts of France, primogeniture, in which the eldest son would inherit a title, was growing in popularity. In other parts of Europe, including Normandy and England, the tradition was for lands to be divided, with the eldest son taking patrimonial lands – usually considered to be the most valuable – and younger sons given smaller, or more recently acquired, partitions or estates.

In dividing his lands, William appears to have followed the Norman tradition, distinguishing between Normandy, which he had inherited, and England, which he had acquired through war. William's second son, Richard, had died in a hunting accident, leaving Henry and his two brothers to inherit William's estate. Robert, the eldest, despite being in armed rebellion against his father at the time of his death, received Normandy. England was given to William Rufus, who was in favour with the dying king. Henry was given a large sum of money, usually reported as £5,000, with the expectation that he would also be given his mother's modest set of lands in Buckinghamshire and Gloucestershire. William's funeral at Caen was marred by angry complaints from a local man, and Henry may have been responsible for resolving the dispute by buying off the protester with silver.

Robert returned to Normandy, expecting to have been given both the Duchy and England, to find that William Rufus had crossed the Channel and been crowned king. The two brothers disagreed fundamentally over the inheritance, and Robert soon began to plan an invasion of England to seize the kingdom, helped by a rebellion by some of the leading nobles against William Rufus. Henry remained in Normandy and took up a role within Robert's court, possibly either because he was unwilling to side openly with William Rufus, or because Robert might have taken the opportunity to confiscate Henry's inherited money if he had tried to leave. William Rufus sequestered Henry's new estates in England, leaving Henry landless.

In 1088, Robert's plans for the invasion of England began to falter, and he turned to Henry, proposing that his brother lend him some of his inheritance, which Henry refused. Henry and Robert then came to an alternative arrangement, in which Robert would make Henry the count of western Normandy, in exchange for £3,000. Henry's lands were a new countship created by a delegation of the ducal authority in the Cotentin, but it extended across the Avranchin, with control over the bishoprics of both. This also gave Henry influence over two major Norman leaders, Hugh d'Avranches and Richard de Redvers, and the abbey of Mont Saint-Michel, whose lands spread out further across the Duchy. Robert's invasion force failed to leave Normandy, leaving William Rufus secure in England.

Count of the Cotentin, 1088–90

Henry quickly established himself as count, building up a network of followers from western Normandy and eastern Brittany, whom the historian John Le Patourel has characterised as "Henry's gang". His early supporters included Roger of Mandeville, Richard of Redvers, Richard d'Avranches and Robert Fitzhamon, along with the churchman Roger of Salisbury. Robert attempted to go back on his deal with Henry and re-appropriate the county, but Henry's grip was already sufficiently firm to prevent this. Robert's rule of the duchy was chaotic, and parts of Henry's lands became almost independent of central control from Rouen.

During this period, neither William nor Robert seems to have trusted Henry. Waiting until the rebellion against William Rufus was safely over, Henry returned to England in July 1088. He met with the King but was unable to persuade him to grant him their mother's estates, and travelled back to Normandy in the autumn. While he had been away, however, Odo, Bishop of Bayeux, who regarded Henry as a potential competitor, had convinced Robert that Henry was conspiring against the duke with William Rufus. On landing, Odo seized Henry and imprisoned him in Neuilly-la-Forêt, and Robert took back the county of the Cotentin. Henry was held there over the winter, but in the spring of 1089 the senior elements of the Normandy nobility prevailed upon Robert to release him.

Although no longer formally the Count of Cotentin, Henry continued to control the west of Normandy. The struggle between his brothers continued. William Rufus continued to put down resistance to his rule in England, but began to build a series of alliances against Robert with barons in Normandy and neighbouring Ponthieu. Robert allied himself with Philip I of France. In late 1090 William Rufus encouraged Conan Pilatus, a powerful burgher in Rouen, to rebel against Robert; Conan was supported by most of Rouen and made appeals to the neighbouring ducal garrisons to switch allegiance as well.

Robert issued an appeal for help to his barons, and Henry was the first to arrive in Rouen in November. Violence broke out, leading to savage, confused street fighting as both sides attempted to take control of the city. Robert and Henry left the castle to join the battle, but Robert then retreated, leaving Henry to continue the fighting. The battle turned in favour of the ducal forces and Henry took Conan prisoner. Henry was angry that Conan had turned against his feudal lord. He had him taken to the top of Rouen Castle and then, despite Conan's offers to pay a huge ransom, threw him off the top of the castle to his death. Contemporaries considered Henry to have acted appropriately in making an example of Conan, and Henry became famous for his exploits in the battle.

Fall and rise, 1091–99

In the aftermath, Robert forced Henry to leave Rouen, probably because Henry's role in the fighting had been more prominent than his own, and possibly because Henry had asked to be formally reinstated as the count of the Cotentin. In early 1091, William Rufus invaded Normandy with a sufficiently large army to bring Robert to the negotiating table. The two brothers signed a treaty at Rouen, granting William Rufus a range of lands and castles in Normandy. In return, William Rufus promised to support Robert's attempts to regain control of the neighbouring county of Maine, once under Norman control, and help in regaining control over the duchy, including Henry's lands. They nominated each other as heirs to England and Normandy, excluding Henry from any succession while either one of them lived.

War now broke out between Henry and his brothers. Henry mobilised a mercenary army in the west of Normandy, but as William Rufus and Robert's forces advanced, his network of baronial support melted away. Henry focused his remaining forces at Mont Saint-Michel, where he was besieged, probably in March 1091. The site was easy to defend, but lacked fresh water. The chronicler William of Malmesbury suggested that when Henry's water ran short, Robert allowed his brother fresh supplies, leading to remonstrations between Robert and William Rufus. The events of the final days of the siege are unclear: the besiegers had begun to argue about the future strategy for the campaign, but Henry then abandoned Mont Saint-Michel, probably as part of a negotiated surrender. He left for Brittany and crossed over into France.

Henry's next steps are not well documented; one chronicler, Orderic Vitalis, suggests that he travelled in the French Vexin, along the Normandy border, for over a year with a small band of followers. By the end of the year, Robert and William Rufus had fallen out once again, and the Treaty of Rouen had been abandoned. In 1092, Henry and his followers seized the Normandy town of Domfront. Domfront had previously been controlled by Robert of Bellême, but the inhabitants disliked his rule and invited Henry to take over the town, which he did in a bloodless coup. Over the next two years, Henry re-established his network of supporters across western Normandy, forming what Judith Green terms a "court in waiting". By 1094, he was allocating lands and castles to his followers as if he were the Duke of Normandy. William Rufus began to support Henry with money, encouraging his campaign against Robert, and Henry used some of this to construct a substantial castle at Domfront.

William Rufus crossed into Normandy to take the war to Robert in 1094, and when progress stalled, called upon Henry for assistance. Henry responded, but travelled to London instead of joining the main campaign further east in Normandy, possibly at the request of the King, who in any event abandoned the campaign and returned to England. Over the next few years, Henry appears to have strengthened his power base in western Normandy, visiting England occasionally to attend at William Rufus's court. In 1095 Pope Urban II called the First Crusade, encouraging knights from across Europe to join. Robert joined the Crusade, borrowing money from William Rufus to do so, and granting the King temporary custody of his part of the Duchy in exchange. The King appeared confident of regaining the remainder of Normandy from Robert, and Henry appeared ever closer to William Rufus. They campaigned together in the Norman Vexin between 1097 and 1098.

Early reign, 1100–06

Taking the throne, 1100

On the afternoon of 2 August 1100, King William Rufus went hunting in the New Forest, accompanied by a team of huntsmen and Norman nobility, including Henry. An arrow, possibly shot by the baron Walter Tirel, hit and killed William Rufus. Many conspiracy theories have been put forward suggesting that the King was killed deliberately; most modern historians reject these, as hunting was a risky activity and such accidents were common. Chaos broke out, and Tirel fled the scene for France, either because he had shot the fatal arrow, or because he had been incorrectly accused and feared that he would be made a scapegoat for the King's death.

Henry rode to Winchester, where an argument ensued as to who now had the best claim to the throne. William of Breteuil championed the rights of Robert, who was still abroad, returning from the Crusade, and to whom Henry and the barons had given homage in previous years. Henry argued that, unlike Robert, he had been born to a reigning king and queen, thereby giving him a claim under the right of porphyrogeniture. Tempers flared, but Henry, supported by Henry de Beaumont and Robert of Meulan, held sway and persuaded the barons to follow him. He occupied Winchester Castle and seized the royal treasury.

Henry was hastily crowned king in Westminster Abbey on 5 August by Maurice, the bishop of London, as Anselm, the archbishop of Canterbury, had been exiled by William Rufus, and Thomas, the archbishop of York, was in the north of England at Ripon. In accordance with English tradition and in a bid to legitimise his rule, Henry issued a coronation charter laying out various commitments. The new king presented himself as having restored order to a trouble-torn country. He announced that he would abandon William Rufus's policies towards the Church, which had been seen as oppressive by the clergy; he promised to prevent royal abuses of the barons' property rights, and assured a return to the gentler customs of Edward the Confessor; he asserted that he would "establish a firm peace" across England and ordered "that this peace shall henceforth be kept".

As well as his existing circle of supporters, many of whom were richly rewarded with new lands, Henry quickly co-opted many of the existing administration into his new royal household. William Giffard, William Rufus's chancellor, was made the bishop of Winchester, and the prominent sheriffs Urse d'Abetot, Haimo Dapifer and Robert Fitzhamon continued to play a senior role in government. By contrast, the unpopular Ranulf Flambard, the bishop of Durham and a key member of the previous regime, was imprisoned in the Tower of London and charged with corruption. The late king had left many Church positions unfilled, and Henry set about nominating candidates to these, in an effort to build further support for his new government. The appointments needed to be consecrated, and Henry wrote to Anselm, apologising for having been crowned while the archbishop was still in France and asking him to return at once.

Marriage to Matilda, 1100

On 11 November 1100 Henry married Matilda, the daughter of Malcolm III of Scotland, in Westminster Abbey. Henry was now around 31 years old, but late marriages for noblemen were not unusual in the 11th century. The pair had probably first met earlier the previous decade, possibly being introduced through Bishop Osmund of Salisbury. Historian Warren Hollister argues that Henry and Matilda were emotionally close, but their union was also certainly politically motivated. Matilda had originally been named Edith, an Anglo-Saxon name, and was a member of the West Saxon royal family, being the niece of Edgar the Ætheling, the great-granddaughter of Edmund Ironside and a descendant of Alfred the Great. For Henry, marrying Matilda gave his reign increased legitimacy, and for Matilda, an ambitious woman, it was an opportunity for high status and power in England.

Matilda had been educated in a sequence of convents and may well have taken the vows to formally become a nun, which formed an obstacle to the marriage progressing. She did not wish to be a nun and appealed to Anselm for permission to marry Henry, and the Archbishop established a council at Lambeth Palace to judge the issue. Despite some dissenting voices, the council concluded that although Matilda had lived in a convent, she had not actually become a nun and was therefore free to marry, a judgement that Anselm then affirmed, allowing the marriage to proceed. Matilda proved an effective queen for Henry, acting as a regent in England on occasion, addressing and presiding over councils, and extensively supporting the arts. The couple soon had two children, Matilda, born in 1102, and William Adelin, born in 1103; it is possible that they also had a second son, Richard, who died young. Following the birth of these children, Matilda preferred to remain based in Westminster while Henry travelled across England and Normandy, either for religious reasons or because she enjoyed being involved in the machinery of royal governance.

Henry had a considerable sexual appetite and enjoyed a substantial number of sexual partners, resulting in many illegitimate children, at least nine sons and 13 daughters, many of whom he appears to have recognised and supported. It was normal for unmarried Anglo-Norman noblemen to have sexual relations with prostitutes and local women, and kings were also expected to have mistresses. Some of these relationships occurred before Henry was married, but many others took place after his marriage to Matilda. Henry had a wide range of mistresses from a range of backgrounds, and the relationships appear to have been conducted relatively openly. He may have chosen some of his noble mistresses for political purposes, but the evidence to support this theory is limited.

Treaty of Alton, 1101–02

By early 1101, Henry's new regime was established and functioning, but many of the Anglo-Norman elite still supported his brother Robert, or would be prepared to switch sides if Robert appeared likely to gain power in England. In February, Flambard escaped from the Tower of London and crossed the Channel to Normandy, where he injected fresh direction and energy to Robert's attempts to mobilise an invasion force. By July, Robert had formed an army and a fleet, ready to move against Henry in England. Raising the stakes in the conflict, Henry seized Flambard's lands and, with the support of Anselm, Flambard was removed from his position as bishop. The King held court in April and June, where the nobility renewed their oaths of allegiance to him, but their support still appeared partial and shaky.

With the invasion imminent, Henry mobilised his forces and fleet outside Pevensey, close to Robert's anticipated landing site, training some of them personally in how to counter cavalry charges. Despite English levies and knights owing military service to the Church arriving in considerable numbers, many of his barons did not appear. Anselm intervened with some of the doubters, emphasising the religious importance of their loyalty to Henry. Robert unexpectedly landed further up the coast at Portsmouth on 20 July with a modest force of a few hundred men, but these were quickly joined by many of the barons in England. Instead of marching into nearby Winchester and seizing Henry's treasury, Robert paused, giving Henry time to march west and intercept the invasion force.

The two armies met at Alton, Hampshire, where peace negotiations began, possibly initiated by either Henry or Robert, and probably supported by Flambard. The brothers then agreed to the Treaty of Alton, under which Robert released Henry from his oath of homage and recognised him as king; Henry renounced his claims on western Normandy, except for Domfront, and agreed to pay Robert £2,000 a year for life; if either brother died without a male heir, the other would inherit his lands; the barons whose lands had been seized by either the King or the Duke for supporting his rival would have them returned, and Flambard would be reinstated as bishop; the two brothers would campaign together to defend their territories in Normandy. Robert remained in England for a few months more with Henry before returning to Normandy.

Despite the treaty, Henry set about inflicting severe penalties on the barons who had stood against him during the invasion. William de Warenne, the Earl of Surrey, was accused of fresh crimes, which were not covered by the Alton amnesty, and was banished from England. In 1102 Henry then turned against Robert of Bellême and his brothers, the most powerful of the barons, accusing him of 45 different offences. Robert escaped and took up arms against Henry. Henry besieged Robert's castles at Arundel, Tickhill and Shrewsbury, pushing down into the south-west to attack Bridgnorth. His power base in England broken, Robert accepted Henry's offer of banishment and left the country for Normandy.

Conquest of Normandy, 1103–06

Henry's network of allies in Normandy became stronger during 1103. He arranged the marriages of his illegitimate daughters, Juliane and Matilda, to Eustace of Breteuil and Rotrou III, Count of Perche, respectively, the latter union securing the Norman border. Henry attempted to win over other members of the Norman nobility and gave other English estates and lucrative offers to key Norman lords. Duke Robert continued to fight Robert of Bellême, but the Duke's position worsened, until by 1104, he had to ally himself formally with Bellême to survive. Arguing that the Duke had broken the terms of their treaty, the King crossed over the Channel to Domfront, where he met with senior barons from across Normandy, eager to ally themselves with him. He confronted the Duke and accused him of siding with his enemies, before returning to England.

Normandy continued to disintegrate into chaos. In 1105, Henry sent his friend Robert Fitzhamon and a force of knights into the Duchy, apparently to provoke a confrontation with Duke Robert. Fitzhamon was captured, and Henry used this as an excuse to invade, promising to restore peace and order. Henry had the support of most of the neighbouring counts around Normandy's borders, and King Philip of France was persuaded to remain neutral. Henry occupied western Normandy, and advanced east on Bayeux, where Fitzhamon was held. The city refused to surrender, and Henry besieged it, burning it to the ground. Terrified of meeting the same fate, the town of Caen switched sides and surrendered, allowing Henry to advance on Falaise, Calvados, which he took with some casualties. His campaign stalled, and the King instead began peace discussions with Robert. The negotiations were inconclusive and the fighting dragged on until Christmas, when Henry returned to England.

Henry invaded again in July 1106, hoping to provoke a decisive battle. After some initial tactical successes, he turned south-west towards the castle of Tinchebray. He besieged the castle and Duke Robert, supported by Robert of Bellême, advanced from Falaise to relieve it. After attempts at negotiation failed, the Battle of Tinchebray took place, probably on 28 September. The battle lasted around an hour, and began with a charge by Duke Robert's cavalry; the infantry and dismounted knights of both sides then joined the battle. Henry's reserves, led by Elias I, Count of Maine, and Alan IV, Duke of Brittany, attacked the enemy's flanks, routing first Bellême's troops and then the bulk of the ducal forces. Duke Robert was taken prisoner, but Bellême escaped.

Henry mopped up the remaining resistance in Normandy, and Duke Robert ordered his last garrisons to surrender. Reaching Rouen, Henry reaffirmed the laws and customs of Normandy and took homage from the leading barons and citizens. The lesser prisoners taken at Tinchebray were released, but the Duke and several other leading nobles were imprisoned indefinitely. The Duke's son, William Clito, was only three years old and was released to the care of Helias of Saint-Saens, a Norman baron. Henry reconciled himself with Robert of Bellême, who gave up the ducal lands he had seized and rejoined the royal court. Henry had no way of legally removing the Duchy from his brother, and initially Henry avoided using the title "duke" at all, emphasising that, as the king of England, he was only acting as the guardian of the troubled Duchy.

Government, family and household

Government, law and court

Henry inherited the kingdom of England from William Rufus, giving him a claim of suzerainty over Wales and Scotland, and acquired the Duchy of Normandy, a complex entity with troubled borders. The borders between England and Scotland were still uncertain during Henry's reign, with Anglo-Norman influence pushing northwards through Cumbria, but his relationship with King David I of Scotland was generally good, partially due to Henry's marriage to his sister. In Wales, Henry used his power to coerce and charm the indigenous Welsh princes, while Norman Marcher Lords pushed across the valleys of South Wales. Normandy was controlled via interlocking networks of ducal, ecclesiastical and family contacts, backed by a growing string of important ducal castles along the borders. Alliances and relationships with neighbouring counties along the Norman border were particularly important to maintaining the stability of the Duchy.

Henry ruled through the barons and lords in England and Normandy, whom he manipulated skilfully for political effect. Political friendships, termed amicitia in Latin, were important during the 12th century, and Henry maintained a wide range of these, mediating between his friends in factions across his realm when necessary, and rewarding those who were loyal to him. He also had a reputation for punishing those barons who stood against him, and he maintained an effective network of informers and spies who reported to him on events. Henry was a harsh, firm ruler, but not excessively so by the standards of the day. Over time, he increased the degree of his control over the barons, removing his enemies and bolstering his friends until the "reconstructed baronage", as historian Warren Hollister describes it, was predominantly loyal and dependent on the King.

Henry's itinerant royal court comprised several parts. At the heart was his domestic household, called the domus; a wider grouping was termed the familia regis, and formal gatherings of the court were termed curia. The domus was divided into several parts. The chapel, headed by the chancellor, looked after the royal documents, the chamber dealt with financial affairs and the master-marshal was responsible for travel and accommodation. The familia regis included Henry's mounted household troops, up to several hundred strong, who came from a wider range of social backgrounds, and could be deployed across England and Normandy as required. Initially Henry continued his father's practice of regular crown-wearing ceremonies at his curia, but they became less frequent as the years passed. Henry's court was grand and ostentatious, financing the construction of large new buildings and castles with a range of precious gifts on display, including his private menagerie of exotic animals, which he kept at Woodstock Palace. Despite being a lively community, Henry's court was more tightly controlled than those of previous kings. Strict rules controlled personal behaviour and prohibited members of the court from pillaging neighbouring villages, as had been the norm under William Rufus.

Henry was responsible for a substantial expansion of the royal justice system. In England, Henry drew on the existing Anglo-Saxon system of justice, local government and taxes, but strengthened it with more central governmental institutions. Roger of Salisbury began to develop the royal exchequer after 1110, using it to collect and audit revenues from the King's sheriffs in the shires. Itinerant justices began to emerge under Henry, travelling around the country managing eyre courts, and many more laws were formally recorded. Henry gathered increasing revenue from the expansion of royal justice, both from fines and from fees. The first Pipe Roll that is known to have survived dates from 1130, recording royal expenditures. Henry reformed the coinage in 1107, 1108 and in 1125, inflicting harsh corporal punishments to English coiners who had been found guilty of debasing the currency. In Normandy, he restored law and order after 1106, operating through a body of Norman justices and an exchequer system similar to that in England. Norman institutions grew in scale and scope under Henry, although less quickly than in England. Many of the officials that ran Henry's system were termed "new men", relatively low-born individuals who rose through the ranks as administrators, managing justice or the royal revenues.

Relations with the Church

Church and the King

Henry's ability to govern was intimately bound up with the Church, which formed the key to the administration of both England and Normandy, and this relationship changed considerably over the course of his reign. William the Conqueror had reformed the English Church with the support of his Archbishop of Canterbury, Lanfranc, who became a close colleague and advisor to the King. Under William Rufus this arrangement had collapsed, the King and Archbishop Anselm had become estranged and Anselm had gone into exile. Henry also believed in Church reform, but on taking power in England he became embroiled in the investiture controversy.

The argument concerned who should invest a new bishop with his staff and ring: traditionally, this had been carried out by the King in a symbolic demonstration of royal power, but Pope Urban II had condemned this practice in 1099, arguing that only the papacy could carry out this task, and declaring that the clergy should not give homage to their local temporal rulers. Anselm returned to England from exile in 1100 having heard Urban's pronouncement, and informed Henry that he would be complying with the Pope's wishes. Henry was in a difficult position. On one hand, the symbolism and homage was important to him; on the other hand, he needed Anselm's support in his struggle with his brother Duke Robert.

Anselm stuck firmly to the letter of the papal decree, despite Henry's attempts to persuade him to give way in return for a vague assurance of a future royal compromise. Matters escalated, with Anselm going back into exile and Henry confiscating the revenues of his estates. Anselm threatened excommunication, and in July 1105 the two men finally negotiated a solution. A distinction was drawn between the secular and ecclesiastical powers of the prelates, under which Henry gave up his right to invest his clergy, but retained the custom of requiring them to come and do homage for the temporalities, the landed properties they held in England. Despite this argument, the pair worked closely together, combining to deal with Duke Robert's invasion of 1101, for example, and holding major reforming councils in 1102 and 1108.

A long-running dispute between the Archbishops of Canterbury and York flared up under Anselm's successor, Ralph d'Escures. Canterbury, traditionally the senior of the two establishments, had long argued that the Archbishop of York should formally promise to obey their Archbishop, but York argued that the two episcopates were independent within the English Church and that no such promise was necessary. Henry supported the primacy of Canterbury, to ensure that England remained under a single ecclesiastical administration, but the Pope preferred the case of York. The matter was complicated by Henry's personal friendship with Thurstan, the Archbishop of York, and the King's desire that the case should not end up in a papal court, beyond royal control. Henry needed the support of the Papacy in his struggle with Louis of France, however, and therefore allowed Thurstan to attend the Council of Rheims in 1119, where Thurstan was then consecrated by the Pope with no mention of any duty towards Canterbury. Henry believed that this went against assurances Thurstan had previously made and exiled him from England until the King and Archbishop came to a negotiated solution the following year.

Even after the investiture dispute, Henry continued to play a major role in the selection of new English and Norman bishops and archbishops. He appointed many of his officials to bishoprics and, as historian Martin Brett suggests, "some of his officers could look forward to a mitre with all but absolute confidence". Henry's chancellors, and those of his queens, became bishops of Durham, Hereford, London, Lincoln, Winchester and Salisbury. Henry increasingly drew on a wider range of these bishops as advisors – particularly Roger of Salisbury – breaking with the earlier tradition of relying primarily on the Archbishop of Canterbury. The result was a cohesive body of administrators through which Henry could exercise careful influence, holding general councils to discuss key matters of policy. This stability shifted slightly after 1125, when he began to inject a wider range of candidates into the senior positions of the Church, often with more reformist views, and the impact of this generation would be felt in the years after Henry's death.

Personal beliefs and piety

Like other rulers of the period, Henry donated to the Church and patronised several religious communities, but contemporary chroniclers did not consider him an unusually pious king. His personal beliefs and piety may have developed during the course of his life; Henry had always taken an interest in religion, but in his later years he may have become much more concerned about spiritual affairs. If so, the major shifts in his thinking would appear to have occurred after 1120, when his son William Adelin died, and 1129, when his daughter's marriage teetered on the verge of collapse.

As a proponent of religious reform, Henry gave extensively to reformist groups within the Church. He was a keen supporter of the Cluniac order, probably for intellectual reasons. He donated money to the abbey at Cluny itself, and after 1120 gave generously to Reading Abbey, a Cluniac establishment. Construction on Reading began in 1121, and Henry endowed it with rich lands and extensive privileges, making it a symbol of his dynastic lines. He also focused effort on promoting the conversion of communities of clerks into Augustinian canons, the foundation of leper hospitals, expanding the provision of nunneries, and the charismatic orders of the Savigniacs and Tironensians. He was an avid collector of relics, sending an embassy to Constantinople in 1118 to collect Byzantine items, some of which were donated to Reading Abbey.

Later reign, 1107–1135

Continental and Welsh politics, 1108–1114
Normandy faced an increased threat from France, Anjou and Flanders after 1108. King Louis VI succeeded to the French throne in 1108 and began to reassert central royal power. Louis demanded Henry give homage to him and that two disputed castles along the Normandy border be placed into the control of neutral castellans. Henry refused, and Louis responded by mobilising an army. After some arguments, the two kings negotiated a truce and retreated without fighting, leaving the underlying issues unresolved. Fulk V assumed power in Anjou in 1109 and began to rebuild Angevin authority. He inherited the county of Maine, but refused to recognise Henry as his feudal lord and instead allied himself with Louis. Robert II of Flanders also briefly joined the alliance, before his death in 1111.

In 1108, Henry betrothed his six-year-old daughter, Matilda, to Henry V, the future Holy Roman Emperor. For King Henry, this was a prestigious match; for Henry V, it was an opportunity to restore his financial situation and fund an expedition to Italy, as he received a dowry of £6,666 from England and Normandy. Raising this money proved challenging, and required the implementation of a special "aid", or tax, in England. Matilda was crowned German queen in 1110.

Henry responded to the French and Angevin threat by expanding his own network of supporters beyond the Norman borders. Some Norman barons deemed unreliable were arrested or dispossessed, and Henry used their forfeited estates to bribe his potential allies in the neighbouring territories, in particular Maine. Around 1110, Henry attempted to arrest the young William Clito, but William's mentors moved him to the safety of Flanders before he could be taken. At about this time, Henry probably began to style himself as the duke of Normandy. Robert of Bellême turned against Henry once again, and when he appeared at Henry's court in 1112 in a new role as a French ambassador, he was arrested and imprisoned.

Rebellions broke out in France and Anjou between 1111 and 1113, and Henry crossed into Normandy to support his nephew, Count Theobald II, Count of Champagne, who had sided against Louis in the uprising. In a bid to isolate Louis diplomatically, Henry betrothed his young son, William Adelin, to Fulk's daughter Matilda, and married his illegitimate daughter Matilda to Duke Conan III of Brittany, creating alliances with Anjou and Brittany respectively. Louis backed down and in March 1113 met with Henry near Gisors to agree a peace settlement, giving Henry the disputed fortresses and confirming Henry's overlordship of Maine, Bellême and Brittany.

Meanwhile, the situation in Wales was deteriorating. Henry had conducted a campaign in South Wales in 1108, pushing out royal power in the region and colonising the area around Pembroke with Flemings. By 1114, some of the resident Norman lords were under attack, while in Mid-Wales, Owain ap Cadwgan blinded one of the political hostages he was holding, and in North Wales Gruffudd ap Cynan threatened the power of the Earl of Chester. Henry sent three armies into Wales that year, with Gilbert Fitz Richard leading a force from the south, Alexander, King of Scotland, pressing from the north and Henry himself advancing into Mid-Wales. Owain and Gruffudd sued for peace, and Henry accepted a political compromise. He reinforced the Welsh Marches with his own appointees, strengthening the border territories.

Rebellion, 1115–1120

Concerned about the succession, Henry sought to persuade Louis VI to accept his son, William Adelin, as the legitimate future Duke of Normandy, in exchange for his son's homage. Henry crossed into Normandy in 1115 and assembled the Norman barons to swear loyalty; he also almost successfully negotiated a settlement with Louis, affirming William's right to the Duchy in exchange for a large sum of money. Louis, backed by his ally Baldwin of Flanders, instead declared that he considered William Clito the legitimate heir to the Duchy.

War broke out after Henry returned to Normandy with an army to support Theobald of Blois, who was under attack from Louis. Henry and Louis raided each other's towns along the border, and a wider conflict then broke out, probably in 1116. Henry was pushed onto the defensive as French, Flemish and Angevin forces began to pillage the Normandy countryside. Amaury III of Montfort and many other barons rose up against Henry, and there was an assassination plot from within his own household. Henry's wife, Matilda, died in early 1118, but the situation in Normandy was sufficiently pressing that Henry was unable to return to England for her funeral.

Henry responded by mounting campaigns against the rebel barons and deepening his alliance with Theobald. Baldwin of Flanders was wounded in battle and died in September 1118, easing the pressure on Normandy from the north-east. Henry attempted to crush a revolt in the city of Alençon, but was defeated by Fulk and the Angevin army. Forced to retreat from Alençon, Henry's position deteriorated alarmingly, as his resources became overstretched and more barons abandoned his cause. Early in 1119, Eustace of Breteuil and Henry's daughter, Juliana, threatened to join the baronial revolt. Hostages were exchanged in a bid to avoid conflict, but relations broke down and both sides mutilated their captives. Henry attacked and took the town of Breteuil, Eure, despite Juliana's attempt to kill her father with a crossbow. In the aftermath, Henry dispossessed the couple of almost all of their lands in Normandy.

Henry's situation improved in May 1119 when he enticed Fulk to switch sides by finally agreeing to marry William Adelin to Fulk's daughter, Matilda, and paying Fulk a large sum of money. Fulk left for the Levant, leaving the County of Maine in Henry's care, and the King was free to focus on crushing his remaining enemies. During the summer Henry advanced into the Norman Vexin, where he encountered Louis's army, resulting in the Battle of Brémule. Henry appears to have deployed scouts and then organised his troops into several carefully formed lines of dismounted knights. Unlike Henry's forces, the French knights remained mounted; they hastily charged the Anglo-Norman positions, breaking through the first rank of the defences but then becoming entangled in Henry's second line of knights. Surrounded, the French army began to collapse. In the melee, Henry was hit by a sword blow, but his armour protected him. Louis and William Clito escaped from the battle, leaving Henry to return to Rouen in triumph.

The war slowly petered out after this battle, and Louis took the dispute over Normandy to Pope Callixtus II's council in Reims that October. Henry faced French complaints concerning his acquisition and subsequent management of Normandy, and despite being defended by Geoffrey, the Archbishop of Rouen, Henry's case was shouted down by the pro-French elements of the council. Callixtus declined to support Louis, and merely advised the two rulers to seek peace. Amaury de Montfort came to terms with Henry, but Henry and William Clito failed to find a mutually satisfactory compromise. In June 1120, Henry and Louis formally made peace on terms advantageous to the King of England: William Adelin gave homage to Louis, and in return Louis confirmed William's rights to the Duchy.

Succession crisis, 1120–1124

Henry's succession plans were thrown into chaos by the sinking of the White Ship on 25 November 1120. Henry had left the port of Barfleur for England in the early evening, leaving William Adelin and many of the younger members of the court to follow on that night in a separate vessel, the White Ship. Both the crew and passengers were drunk and, just outside the harbour, the ship hit a submerged rock. The ship sank, killing as many as 300 people, with only one survivor, a butcher from Rouen. Henry's court was initially too scared to report William's death to the King. When he was finally told, he collapsed with grief.

The disaster left Henry with no legitimate son, his nephews now the closest possible male heirs. Henry announced he would take a new wife, Adeliza of Louvain, opening up the prospect of a new royal son, and the two were married at Windsor Castle in January 1121. Henry appears to have chosen her because she was attractive and came from a prestigious noble line. Adeliza seems to have been fond of Henry and joined him in his travels, probably to maximise the chances of her conceiving a child. The White Ship disaster initiated fresh conflict in Wales, where the drowning of Richard, Earl of Chester, encouraged a rebellion led by Maredudd ap Bleddyn. Henry intervened in North Wales that summer with an army and, although he was hit by a Welsh arrow, the campaign reaffirmed royal power across the region.

Henry's alliance with Anjou – which had been based on his son William marrying Fulk's daughter Matilda – began to disintegrate. Fulk returned from the Levant and demanded that Henry return Matilda and her dowry, a range of estates and fortifications in Maine. Matilda left for Anjou, but Henry argued that the dowry had in fact originally belonged to him before it came into the possession of Fulk, and so declined to hand the estates back to Anjou. Fulk married his daughter Sibylla to William Clito, and granted them Maine. Once again, conflict broke out, as Amaury de Montfort allied himself with Fulk and led a revolt along the Norman-Anjou border in 1123. Amaury was joined by several other Norman barons, headed by Waleran de Beaumont, one of the sons of Henry's old ally, Robert of Meulan.

Henry dispatched Robert of Gloucester and Ranulf le Meschin to Normandy and then intervened himself in late 1123. He began the process of besieging the rebel castles, before wintering in the Duchy. In the spring of 1124, campaigning began again. In the battle of Bourgthéroulde, Odo Borleng, castellan of Bernay, Eure, led the King's army and received intelligence that the rebels were departing from the rebel base in Beaumont-le-Roger allowing him to ambush them as they traversed through the Brotonne forest. Waleran charged the royal forces, but his knights were cut down by Odo's archers and the rebels were quickly overwhelmed. Waleran was captured, but Amaury escaped. Henry mopped up the remainder of the rebellion, blinding some of the rebel leaders – considered, at the time, a more merciful punishment than execution – and recovering the last rebel castles. He paid Pope Callixtus a large amount of money, in exchange for the Papacy annulling the marriage of William Clito and Sibylla on the grounds of consanguinity.

Planning the succession, 1125–1134
Henry and Adeliza did not conceive any children, generating prurient speculation as to the possible explanation, and the future of the dynasty appeared at risk. Henry may have begun to look among his nephews for a possible heir. He may have considered Stephen of Blois as a possible option and, perhaps in preparation for this, he arranged a beneficial marriage for Stephen to a wealthy heiress, Matilda. Theobald of Blois, his close ally, may have also felt that he was in favour with Henry. William Clito, who was King Louis's preferred choice, remained opposed to Henry and was therefore unsuitable. Henry may have also considered his own illegitimate son, Robert of Gloucester, as a possible candidate, but English tradition and custom would have looked unfavourably on this.

Henry's plans shifted when the Empress Matilda's husband, the Emperor Henry, died in 1125. The King recalled his daughter to England the next year and declared that, should he die without a male heir, she was to be his rightful successor. The Anglo-Norman barons were gathered together at Westminster at Christmas 1126, where they swore to recognise Matilda and any future legitimate heir she might have. Putting forward a woman as a potential heir in this way was unusual: opposition to Matilda continued to exist within the English court, and Louis was vehemently opposed to her candidacy.

Fresh conflict broke out in 1127, when the childless Charles I, Count of Flanders, was murdered, creating a local succession crisis. Backed by King Louis, William Clito was chosen by the Flemings to become their new ruler. This development potentially threatened Normandy, and Henry began to finance a proxy war in Flanders, promoting the claims of William's Flemish rivals. In an effort to disrupt the French alliance with William, Henry mounted an attack into France in 1128, forcing Louis to cut his aid to William. William died unexpectedly in July, removing the last major challenger to Henry's rule and bringing the war in Flanders to a halt. Without William, the baronial opposition in Normandy lacked a leader. A fresh peace was made with France, and Henry was finally able to release the remaining prisoners from the revolt of 1123, including Waleran of Meulan, who was rehabilitated into the royal court.

Meanwhile, Henry rebuilt his alliance with Fulk of Anjou, this time by marrying Matilda to Fulk's eldest son, Geoffrey. The pair were betrothed in 1127 and married the following year. It is unknown whether Henry intended Geoffrey to have any future claim on England or Normandy, and he was probably keeping his son-in-law's status deliberately uncertain. Similarly, although Matilda was granted several castles in Normandy as part of her dowry, it was not specified when the couple would actually take possession of them. Fulk left Anjou for Jerusalem in 1129, declaring Geoffrey the Count of Anjou and Maine. The marriage proved difficult, as the couple did not particularly like each other and the disputed castles proved a point of contention, resulting in Matilda returning to Normandy later that year. Henry appears to have blamed Geoffrey for the separation, but in 1131 the couple were reconciled. Much to the pleasure and relief of Henry, Matilda then gave birth to a sequence of two sons, Henry and Geoffrey, in 1133 and 1134.

Death and legacy

Death

Relations among Henry, Matilda, and Geoffrey became increasingly strained during the King's final years. Matilda and Geoffrey suspected that they lacked genuine support in England. In 1135 they urged Henry to hand over the royal castles in Normandy to Matilda while he was still alive, and insisted that the Norman nobility swear immediate allegiance to her, thereby giving the couple a more powerful position after Henry's death. Henry angrily declined to do so, probably out of concern that Geoffrey would try to seize power in Normandy. A fresh rebellion broke out among the barons in southern Normandy, led by William III, Count of Ponthieu, whereupon Geoffrey and Matilda intervened in support of the rebels.

Henry campaigned throughout the autumn, strengthening the southern frontier, and then travelled to Lyons-la-Forêt in November to enjoy some hunting, still apparently healthy. There he fell ill – according to the chronicler Henry of Huntingdon, he ate too many ("a surfeit of") lampreys against his physician's advice – and his condition worsened over the course of a week. Once the condition appeared terminal, Henry gave confession and summoned Archbishop Hugh of Amiens, who was joined by Robert of Gloucester and other members of the court. In accordance with custom, preparations were made to settle Henry's outstanding debts and to revoke outstanding sentences of forfeiture. The King died on 1 December 1135, and his corpse was taken to Rouen accompanied by the barons, where it was embalmed; his entrails were buried locally at the priory of Notre-Dame du Pré, and the preserved body was taken on to England, where it was interred at Reading Abbey.

Despite Henry's efforts, the succession was disputed. When news began to spread of the King's death, Geoffrey and Matilda were in Anjou supporting the rebels in their campaign against the royal army, which included a number of Matilda's supporters such as Robert of Gloucester. Many of these barons had taken an oath to stay in Normandy until the late king was properly buried, which prevented them from returning to England. The Norman nobility discussed declaring Theobald of Blois king. Theobald's younger brother, Stephen of Blois, quickly crossed from Boulogne to England, accompanied by his military household. Hugh Bigod dubiously testified that Henry, on his deathbed, had released the barons from their oath to Matilda, and with the help of his brother, Henry of Blois, Stephen  seized power in England and was crowned king on 22 December. Matilda did not give up her claim to England and Normandy, appealing at first to the Pope against the decision to allow the coronation of Stephen, and then invading England to start a prolonged civil war, known as the Anarchy, between 1135 and 1153.

Historiography

Historians have drawn on a range of sources on Henry, including the accounts of chroniclers; other documentary evidence, including early pipe rolls; and surviving buildings and architecture. The three main chroniclers to describe the events of Henry's life were William of Malmesbury, Orderic Vitalis, and Henry of Huntingdon, but each incorporated extensive social and moral commentary into their accounts and borrowed a range of literary devices and stereotypical events from other popular works. Other chroniclers include Eadmer, Hugh the Chanter, Abbot Suger, and the authors of the Welsh Brut. Not all royal documents from the period have survived, but there are several royal acts, charters, writs, and letters, along with some early financial records. Some of these have since been discovered to be forgeries, and others had been subsequently amended or tampered with.

Late medieval historians seized on the accounts of selected chroniclers regarding Henry's education and gave him the title of Henry "Beauclerc", a theme echoed in the analysis of Victorian and Edwardian historians such as Francis Palgrave and Henry Davis. The historian Charles David dismissed this argument in 1929, showing the more extreme claims for Henry's education to be without foundation. Modern histories of Henry commenced with Richard Southern's work in the early 1960s, followed by extensive research during the rest of the 20th century into a wide variety of themes from his reign in England, and a much more limited number of studies of his rule in Normandy. Only two major, modern biographies of Henry have been produced, C. Warren Hollister's posthumous volume in 2001, and Judith Green's 2006 work.

Interpretation of Henry's personality by historians has altered over time. Earlier historians such as Austin Poole and Richard Southern considered Henry as a cruel, draconian ruler. More recent historians, such as Hollister and Green, view his implementation of justice much more sympathetically, particularly when set against the standards of the day, but even Green has noted that Henry was "in many respects highly unpleasant", and Alan Cooper has observed that many contemporary chroniclers were probably too scared of the King to voice much criticism. Historians have also debated the extent to which Henry's administrative reforms genuinely constituted an introduction of what Hollister and John Baldwin have termed systematic, "administrative kingship", or whether his outlook remained fundamentally traditional.

Henry's burial at Reading Abbey is marked by a local cross and a plaque, but Reading Abbey was slowly demolished during the Dissolution of the Monasteries in the 16th century. The exact location is uncertain, but the most likely location of the tomb itself is now in a built-up area of central Reading, on the site of the former abbey choir. A plan to locate his remains was announced in March 2015, with support from English Heritage and Philippa Langley, who aided with the successful discovery and exhumation of Richard III.

Family and children

Legitimate

In addition to Matilda and William, Henry possibly had a short-lived son, Richard, with his first wife, Matilda of Scotland. Henry and his second wife, Adeliza of Louvain, had no children.

Illegitimate
Henry had several illegitimate children by various mistresses.

Sons

 Robert of Gloucester, born in the 1090s.
 Richard, born to Ansfride, brought up by Robert Bloet, the Bishop of Lincoln.
 Reginald de Dunstanville, Earl of Cornwall, born in the 1110s or early 1120s, possibly to Sibyl Corbet.
 Robert FitzEdith, born to Edith Forne.
 Gilbert FitzRoy, possibly born to an unnamed sister or daughter of Walter of Gand.
 William de Tracy, possibly born in the 1090s.
 Henry FitzRoy, possibly born to Nest ferch Rhys.
 Fulk FitzRoy, possibly born to Ansfride.
 William, the full brother of Sybilla of Normandy, probably also of Reginald de Dunstanville.

Daughters

 Matilda FitzRoy, Countess of Perche.
 Matilda FitzRoy, Duchess of Brittany.
 Juliane, wife of Eustace of Breteuil, possibly born to Ansfrida.
 Mabel, wife of William Gouet.
 Constance, Viscountess of Beaumont-sur-Sarthe.
 Aline, wife of Matthew de Montmorency.
 Isabel, daughter of Isabel de Beaumont, Countess of Pembroke.
 Sybilla de Normandy, Queen of Scotland, probably born before 1100.
 Matilda Fitzroy, Abbess of Montivilliers.
 Gundrada de Dunstanville.
 Possibly Rohese, wife of Henry de la Pomerai.
 Emma, wife of Guy of Laval.
 Adeliza, the King's daughter.
 Elizabeth Fitzroy, the wife of Fergus of Galloway.
 Possibly Sibyl of Falaise.

Family tree

Notes

References

Bibliography

External links
 Henry I at the official website of the British monarchy
 Henry I at BBC History

 
1060s births
1135 deaths
11th-century monarchs of England
12th-century English monarchs
12th-century Dukes of Normandy
English people of French descent
House of Normandy
English Roman Catholics
French Roman Catholics
People from Selby
Deaths from food poisoning
Burials at Reading Abbey
Children of William the Conqueror
Norman warriors
Anglo-Normans

Year of birth uncertain